Gater may refer to:
 A fan of the Stargate series
 The Gater, WKGR, a classic rock format radio station in Florida, United States
 John Gater (before 1979), British archaeological geophysicist

See also
 Gait (disambiguation)
Gaiter (disambiguation)
 Gate (disambiguation)
Gator (disambiguation)